Martijn van Haasteren (born 12 September 1980) is a Dutch former professional tennis player who competed for both the Netherlands and the Netherlands Antilles.

Biography
Originally representing the Netherlands, van Haasteren played on tour mostly as a doubles specialist.

He appeared in 11 ATP Tour tournaments from 2006 to 2008, mainly with countryman Jasper Smit, with whom he made the quarter-finals of the events in Amersfoort and Zagreb. The pair also won three Challenger titles. One of those came against future world number one doubles player Jamie Murray and partner Colin Fleming, in Dublin. He reached his career best doubles ranking of 117 in 2007.

In 2008 he switched allegiance to the Netherlands Antilles, in order to play Davis Cup fixtures. He played in the Davis Cup until 2011 and also served as team captain.

As a coach he has been involved with Michel Koning, Matwe Middelkoop, Stephan Fransen, Sander Arends and David Pel.

Challenger titles

Doubles: (3)

References

External links
 
 

1980 births
Living people
Dutch male tennis players
Dutch Antillean male tennis players
Sportspeople from Delft